Robinson Aguirre Ortega (born 23 November 2004) is a professional footballer who plays as a midfielder for Colorado Rapids 2. Born in the United States, he plays for the El Salvador national team.

Professional career
A product of the youth academy of Colorado Rapids, Aguirre was promoted to Colorado Rapids 2 squad in the MLS Next Pro for the 2022 season.

International career
Aguirre was born in the United States to a Honduran father and Salvadoran mother. He was first called up to play for the El Salvador U20s for the Dallas Cup in April 2022, and the 2022 CONCACAF U-20 Championship in June. He was first called up to the senior El Salvador national team for a set of friendlies in April 2022. He debuted as a late substitute in a 4–0 friendly loss to Guatemala on 24 April 2022.

References

External links
 
 
 MLS Soccer profile

2004 births
Living people
Sportspeople from Fairfax, Virginia
Soccer players from Virginia
Salvadoran footballers
El Salvador international footballers
El Salvador youth international footballers
American soccer players
Salvadoran people of Honduran descent
American people of Salvadoran descent
American people of Honduran descent
Association football midfielders
MLS Next Pro players
Colorado Rapids 2 players